Transducin (Gt) is a protein naturally expressed in vertebrate retina rods and cones and it is very important in vertebrate phototransduction. It is a type of heterotrimeric G-protein with different α subunits in rod and cone photoreceptors.

Light leads to conformational changes in rhodopsin, which in turn leads to the activation of transducin. Transducin activates phosphodiesterase, which results in the breakdown of cyclic guanosine monophosphate (cGMP). The intensity of the flash response is directly proportional to the number of transducin activated.

Function in phototransduction
Transducin is activated by metarhodopsin II, a conformational change in rhodopsin caused by the absorption of a photon by the rhodopsin moiety retinal. The light causes isomerization of retinal from 11-cis to all-trans. Isomerization causes a change in the opsin to become metarhodopsin II. When metarhodopsin activates transducin, the guanosine diphosphate (GDP) bound to the α subunit (Tα) is exchanged for guanosine triphosphate (GTP) from the cytoplasm. The α subunit dissociates from the βγ subunits (Tβγ). Activated transducin α-subunit activates cGMP phosphodiesterase. cGMP phosphodiesterase breaks down cGMP, an intracellular second messenger which opens cGMP-gated cation channels. Phosphodiesterase hydrolyzes cGMP to 5’-GMP. Decrease in cGMP concentration leads to decreased opening of cation channels and subsequently, hyperpolarization of the membrane potential.

Transducin is deactivated when the α-subunit-bound GTP is hydrolyzed to GDP. This process is accelerated by a complex containing an RGS (Regulator of G-protein signaling)-protein and the gamma-subunit of the effector, cyclic GMP Phosphodiesterase.

Mechanism of activation

The Tα subunit of transducin contains three functional domains: one for rhodopsin/Tβγ interaction, one for GTP binding, and the last for activation of cGMP phosphodiesterase.

Although the focus for phototransduction is on Tα, Tβγ is crucial for rhodopsin to bind to transducin. The rhodopsin/Tβγ binding domain contains the amino and carboxyl terminal of the Tα. The amino terminal is the site of interaction for rhodopsin while the carboxyl terminal is that for Tβγ binding. The amino terminal might be anchored or in close proximity to the carboxyl terminal for activation of the transducin molecule by rhodopsin.

Interaction with photolyzed rhodopsin opens up the GTP-binding site to allow for rapid exchange of GDP for GTP. The binding site is in the closed conformation in the absence of photolyzed rhodopsin. Normally in the closed conformation, an α-helix located near the binding site is in a position which hinders the GTP/GDP exchange. A conformational change of the Tα by photolyzed rhodopsin causes the tilting of the helix, opening the GTP-binding site.

Once GTP has been exchanged for GDP, the GTP-Tα complex undergoes two major changes: dissociation from photolyzed rhodopsin and the Tβγ subunit and exposure of the phosphodiesterase (PDE) binding site for interaction with latent PDE. The conformational changes initiated in the transducin by binding of GTP are transmitted to the PDE binding site and cause it to be exposed for binding to PDE. The GTP-induced conformational changes could also disrupt the rhodopsin/Tβγ binding site and lead to dissociation from the GTP-Tα complex.

The Tβγ complex

An underlying assumption for G-proteins is that α, β, and γ subunits are present in the same concentration. However, there is evidence that there are more Tβ and Tγ than Tα in rod outer segments (ROS). The excess Tβ and Tγ have been concluded to be floating freely around in the ROS, though it cannot be associated with the Tα at any given time. One possible explanation for the excess Tβγ is increased availability for Tα to rebind. Since Tβγ is crucial for the binding of transducin, reacquisition of the heterotrimeric conformation could lead to more rapid binding to another GTP molecule and thus faster phototransduction.

Though Tβγ has been mentioned to be crucial for Tα binding to rhodopsin, there is also evidence that Tβγ may have a crucial, possibly direct role in nucleotide exchange than previously thought. Rhodopsin was found to specifically cause a conformational switch in the carboxyl terminal of the Tγ subunit. This change ultimately regulates the allosteric nucleotide exchange on the Tα. This domain could serve as a major area for interactions with rhodopsin and for rhodopsin to regulate nucleotide exchange on the Tα. Activation of the G protein transducin by rhodopsin was thought to proceed by the lever mechanism. Rhodopsin-binding causes helix formation at the carboxyl terminal on the Tγ and brings the Tγ carboxyl and Tα. Carboxyl terminals closer together to facilitate nucleotide exchange.

Mutations in this domain abolish rhodopsin-transducin interaction. This conformational switch in the Tγ may be preserved in the G protein γ subunit family.

Interaction with cGMP phosphodiesterase and deactivation

Transducin activation ultimately results in stimulation of the biological effector molecule cGMP phosphodiesterase, an oligomer with α, β and two inhibitory γ subunits. The α and β subunits are the larger molecular weight subunits and make up the catalytic moiety of PDE.

In the phototransduction system, GTP-bound-Tα binds to the γ subunit of PDE. There are two proposed mechanisms for the activation of PDE. The first proposes that the GTP-bound-Tα releases the PDE γ subunit from the catalytic subunits in order to activate hydrolysis. The second more likely mechanism proposes that binding causes a positional shift of the γ subunit, allowing better accessibility of the catalytic subunit for cGMP hydrolysis. The GTPase activity of Tα hydrolyzes GTP to GDP and changes the conformation of the Tα subunit, increasing its affinity to bind to the α and β subunits on the PDE. The binding of Tα to these larger subunits results in another conformational change in PDE and inhibits the hydrolysis ability of the catalytic subunit. This binding site on the larger molecular subunit may be immediately adjacent to the Tα binding site on the γ subunit.

Although the traditional mechanism involves activation of PDE by GTP-bound Tα, GDP-bound Tα has also been demonstrated to have the ability to activate PDE. Experiments of PDE activation in the dark (without the presence of GTP) show small but reproducible PDE activation. This can be explained by the activation of PDE by free GDP-bound Tα. PDE γ subunit affinity for GDP-bound Tα, however, seems to be about 100-fold smaller than for GTP-bound Tα. The mechanism by which GDP-bound Tα activates PDE remains unknown however, it is speculated to be similar to the activation of PDE by GTP-bound Tα.

In order to prevent activation of PDE in the dark, the concentration of GDP-bound Tα should be kept to a minimum. This job seems to fall to the Tβγ to keep the GDP-bound Tα bound in the form of holotransducin.

For deactivation, hydrolysis of the bound GTP by the Tα is necessary for Tα deactivation and returning the transducin to its basal from. However, simple hydrolysis of GTP may not necessarily be enough to deactivate PDE. Tβγ comes into play here again with an important role in PDE deactivation. The addition of Tβγ facilitates inhibition of the PDE catalytic moiety because it binds with the Tα-GTP complex. The reassociated form of transducin is not able to bind to PDE any longer. This frees PDE to recouple to photolyzed rhodopsin and return PDE to its initial state to await activation by another GTP bound Tα.

Genes
 Rods: GNAT1, GNB1, GNGT1; Cones: GNAT2, GNB3, GNGT2

References

External links
 

G proteins